Vivian Gibson (22 October 1898 – 9 May 1981) was a British-born Austrian actress.

Selected filmography
 Demos (1921)
 The Glorious Adventure (1922)
 Fräulein Raffke (1923)
 Countess Maritza (1925)
 The King and the Girl (1925)
 The Man Who Sold Himself (1925)
 Niniche (1925)
 The Little Variety Star (1926)
 Why Get a Divorce? (1926)
 Hunted People (1926)
 Nanette Makes Everything (1926)
 Hell of Love (1926)
 My Heidelberg, I Can Not Forget You (1927)
 Regine (1927)
 Excluded from the Public (1927)
 The Gypsy Baron (1927)
 The Bordello in Rio (1927)
 The Man with the Counterfeit Money (1927)
 Light Cavalry (1927)
 The Orlov (1927)
 The Prince's Child (1927)
 Flirtation (1927)
 The Beloved of His Highness (1928)
 The Runaway Girl (1928)
 The White Sonata (1928)
 The Insurmountable (1928)
 The Criminal of the Century (1928)
 Marriage (1928)
 Champagne (1928)
 Angst (1928)
 The Woman on the Rack (1928)
 The Duty to Remain Silent (1928)
 Beware of Loose Women (1929)
 The Woman of Yesterday and Tomorrow (1928)
 Rustle of Spring (1929)
 Bright Eyes (1929)
 The Mad Bomberg (1932)

Bibliography

External links

1898 births
1981 deaths
English film actresses
English silent film actresses
British emigrants to Austria
20th-century English actresses